Arrowhead Mountain is a  mountain summit located in Chelan County of Washington state. Arrowhead Mountain is part of the Chiwaukum Mountains, which are a subset of the Cascade Range. Its nearest higher neighbor is Jim Hill Mountain,  to the southwest. Precipitation runoff from the peak drains into tributaries of Nason Creek, which in turn is a tributary of the Wenatchee River. This mountain was named by Albert Hale Sylvester (1871–1944), a pioneering surveyor, explorer, topographer, and forest supervisor who named hundreds of natural features in the Cascades.

Climate

Arrowhead Mountain is located in the marine west coast climate zone of western North America. Most weather fronts originate in the Pacific Ocean, and travel northeast toward the Cascade Mountains. As fronts approach, they are forced upward by the peaks of the Cascade Range, causing them to drop their moisture in the form of rain or snowfall onto the Cascades (Orographic lift). As a result, the west side of the Cascades experiences high precipitation, especially during the winter months in the form of snowfall. During winter months, weather is usually cloudy, but, due to high pressure systems over the Pacific Ocean that intensify during summer months, there is often little or no cloud cover during the summer. Because of maritime influence, snow tends to be wet and heavy, resulting in avalanche danger.

Geology

The Alpine Lakes Wilderness features some of the most rugged topography in the Cascade Range with craggy peaks and ridges, deep glacial valleys, and granite walls spotted with over 700 mountain lakes. Geological events occurring many years ago created the diverse topography and drastic elevation changes over the Cascade Range leading to the various climate differences.

During the Pleistocene period dating back over two million years ago, glaciation advancing and retreating repeatedly scoured the landscape leaving deposits of rock debris. The last glacial retreat in the Alpine Lakes area began about 14,000 years ago and was north of the Canada–US border by 10,000 years ago. The "U"-shaped cross section of the river valleys are a result of that recent glaciation. Uplift and faulting in combination with glaciation have been the dominant processes which have created the tall peaks and deep valleys of the Alpine Lakes Wilderness area.

See also

List of peaks of the Alpine Lakes Wilderness

References

External links
 Weather forecast: Arrowhead Mountain
Alpine Lakes Wilderness (Okanogan-Wenatchee National Forest) U.S. Forest Service

Mountains of Washington (state)
Mountains of Chelan County, Washington
Cascade Range
North American 1000 m summits